143 (one hundred [and] forty-three) is the natural number following 142 and preceding 144.

In mathematics
143 is the sum of seven consecutive primes (11 + 13 + 17 + 19 + 23 + 29 + 31). But this number is never the sum of an integer and its base 10 digits, making it a self number.

Every positive integer is the sum of at most 143 seventh powers (see Waring's problem).

143 is the difference in the first exception to the pattern shown below:

.

In the military
 Vickers Type 143 was a British single-seat fighter biplane in 1929
 United States Air Force 143d Airlift Wing airlift unit at Quonset Point, Rhode Island
  was a United States Navy  during World War II
  was a United States Navy  during World War II
  was a United States Navy  during World War II
  was a United States Navy  in World War II
  was a United States Navy patrol boat
  was a United States Navy  during the Cuban Missile Crisis
  was a United States Navy  during World War I

In transportation
 London Buses route 143 is a Transport for London contracted bus route in London
 Air Canada Flight 143, landed at Gimli, Manitoba Air Force Base after gliding  after running out of fuel on July 23, 1983
 Philippine Airlines Flight 143 exploded prior to takeoff on May 11, 1990, at Manila Airport
 Bristol Type 143 was a British twin-engined monoplane aircraft of the Bristol Aeroplane Company
 British Rail Class 143 diesel multiple unit, part of the Pacer family of trains introduced in 1985
 East 143rd Street–St. Mary's Street station on the IRT Pelham Line of the New York City Subway
 143rd Street station on Metra's SouthWest Service in Orland Park, Illinois

In media
 Musicians Ray J and Bobby Brackins wrote the song "143"
 On Mister Rogers' Neighborhood: "Transformations", 143 is used to mean "I love you". 1 meaning I for 1 letter, 4 meaning Love for the 4 letters, and 3 meaning You for the 3 letters. Reportedly, Fred Rogers maintained his weight at exactly 143 pounds for the last thirty years of his life, and associated the number with the phrase "I love you"
 Jake Shimabukuro released the song "143" based on his experience in high school when 143 was sent on a pager to indicate "I Love You" 
 Sal Governale of The Howard Stern Show had a long running saga on the show about his wife who had an emotional friend. He discovered the severity of their relationship when he read their text messages and emails which included "143", shorthand for "I love you".
 Case 143, song by Stray Kids.

In popular culture
143. A popular pager number to communicate "I love you" (based on the number of letters in each of the three words)

In other fields
143 is also:
 The year AD 143 or 143 BC
 143 AH is a year in the Islamic calendar that corresponds to 760 – 761 CE
 143 Adria is a large main belt asteroid
 143 Records label of producer David Foster, a sub-label of Atlantic Records
 Psalm 143
 Sonnet 143 by William Shakespeare
 Slovenia ranks #143 in world population
 The 143, in South Africa, refers to the 143 conscientious objectors who publicly refused to do military service in the Apartheid army in 1988.
 The song “143” by Musiq
 The song “Flying Dream 143” by Elbow
 The atomic number of Unquadtrium, a temporary chemical element

See also
 List of highways numbered 143
 United Nations Security Council Resolution 143
 United States Supreme Court cases, S3XiFi3D 143

References

External links

 The Natural Number 143
 143 at Urban Dictionary
 143 at Virtual Science

Integers